NGC 3553 is a lenticular galaxy in the constellation Ursa Major. It was discovered in March 1885 by Guillaume Bigourdan. It is a member of the galaxy cluster Abell 1185.

References

External links 
 

3553
Lenticular galaxies
Ursa Major (constellation)